Assembly Brewing is a brewery and restaurant in Portland, Oregon.

Description 

Assembly Brewing is a Black-owned brewery and restaurant in southeast Portland's Mt. Scott-Arleta neighborhood, near Foster-Powell. The menu includes Detroit-style pizza, sandwiches, salads, cocktails, and seven beers on tap. Pizza varieties include Hawaiian, "meat-lovers" (with pork roll), and "veggie gourmet". In 2019, Andi Prewitt of Willamette Week said the business is "is now one of the few minority-owned breweries in the country". Assembly is the first Black-owned brewery in Oregon, according to Portland Monthly's Katherine Chew Hamilton.

The restaurant operates in a renovated 7,500 square-foot space owned by Adam Dixon, which was previously housed a Korean grocery store.  The Oregonian's Andre Meunier said, "The exterior sports clean, mid-century lines with a gray and earthy-orange theme. Inside, high ceilings with revealed wooden beams and earth tones create a rustic Portland pub feel, and artisans have crafted metal and wood pieces for the bars and tables." There are four interior murals, one of which was completed by Theo Holdt and inspired by Diego Rivera's Detroit Industry Murals, depicting brewers instead of automotive industry workers. Andy Giegerich of the Portland Business Journal described the artworks as "stunningly detailed". Assembly also has pinball, a covered patio, and a parking lot. Guests must be 21 years of age or older.

History 

Co-founder and brewer George Johnson, originally from Detroit, established the business with Adam Dixon on March 23, 2019.

During Pizza Week in 2021, the restaurant served a pizza called "The D" with pepperoni, Canadian bacon, mushrooms, onions, and green pepper.

Reception 
Willamette Week's Andi Prewitt said Assembly serves "what might be the most authentic Detroit-style pizza in town". Rachel Pinsky included the restaurant in Eater Portland's 2021 overview of "Where to Find Thick, Cheesy Square Pizzas in Portland".

See also

 List of Black-owned restaurants
 Pizza in Portland, Oregon

References

External links 

 

2019 establishments in Oregon
Beer brewing companies based in Oregon
Black-owned restaurants in the United States
Mt. Scott-Arleta, Portland, Oregon
Pizzerias in Portland, Oregon
Restaurants established in 2019